Hasanabad-e Marshad (also Romanized as Ḩasanābād-e Marshad; also known as ’asanābād and Ḩasanābād) is a village in Garizat Rural District, Nir District, Taft County, Yazd Province, Iran. At the 2006 census, its population was 103, in 28 families.

References 

Populated places in Taft County